Harris Station Dam is a hydroelectric dam in Northeast Somerset, Somerset County, Maine. Also known as the Indian Pond Project, the dam was built from 1952 to 1954 as the largest hydroelectric dam in the state of Maine.

The dam creates about 86 megawatts of hydroelectric power. It is owned and operated by Brookfield Renewable.

The Kennebec River valley is flooded upstream of the dam northeasterly through Indian Stream township into Sapling township. Tributaries Bog Brook, Gold Brook, Falls Brook, Coburn Brook, and Brandy Brook enter the west side of the reservoir. East side tributaries are Burnham Brook draining Burnham Pond, and Indian Stream draining Little Indian Bog, Big Indian Pond, Trout Pond, and Moore Bog. The reservoir has good cold water habitat for brook trout, lake trout, and land-locked Atlantic salmon.

References

External links 

Dams in Maine
Hydroelectric power plants in Maine
Reservoirs in Maine
United States power company dams
Buildings and structures in Somerset County, Maine
Gravity dams
Dams completed in 1954
Lakes of Somerset County, Maine